"Fireworks" is a song by the Swedish pop music duo Roxette, released on 5 September 1994 as the third single from their fifth studio album, Crash! Boom! Bang! (1994). It achieved moderate success in various European countries, peaking within the top 20 in Austria and Finland and reaching number 30 on the UK Singles Chart.

Release
The song was the only internationally released single by Roxette to be omitted from their career retrospective The Rox Box, which included every other single released by the duo up to 2006, and it has never appeared on any of the duo's compilation albums—excluding the Jesus Jones remix of the song included on Rarities (1996). In an interview with The Daily Roxette in 2009, Per Gessle was asked why the song was ignored on compilations, saying: "I guess it just wasn't big enough. There are so many other [Roxette] tracks that kick its ass. And on The Rox Box, we decided to use demos and other uplifting stuff instead."

Music video
Irish filmmaker Michael Geoghegan, who also directed videos for their preceding three singles "Almost Unreal", "Sleeping in My Car" and "Crash! Boom! Bang!", directed the music video, which centers around twin sisters who emigrate from the Swedish countryside to London to pursue fame and fortune. In London, the sisters are seen at various locations, including Piccadilly Circus and the London Underground. During the song's bridge, the sisters are sexually assaulted underneath a bridge. They return to Sweden, and, at the end of the video, their younger brother is revealed to be Per Gessle.

Formats and track listings
All songs were written by Per Gessle.

 7-inch single and cassette (Australia 8651124 · UK TCEM324)
 "Fireworks" (Single Edit) – 3:40
 "Dangerous" (Unplugged Version) – 3:13

 CD single (Australia · Europe 8651132)
 "Fireworks" – 3:40
 "Fireworks" (Jesus Jones Remix) – 4:11
 "Dangerous" (Unplugged Version) – 3:13
 "The Rain" (Demo, 29 December 1991) – 4:44

 UK CD1 (CDEMS345)
 "Fireworks" – 3:40
 "Dangerous" (Unplugged Version) – 3:13
 "The Rain" (Demo) – 4:44
 "Crash! Boom! Bang!" (Radio Edit) – 4:25

 UK CD2 (CDEM345)
 "Fireworks" – 3:40
 "I'm Sorry" (Demo, 18 August 1993) – 3:20
 "Fireworks" (Jesus Jones Remix) – 4:11
 "Sleeping in My Car" – 3:47

Charts

References

Roxette songs
1994 singles
1994 songs
EMI Records singles
Music videos directed by Michael Geoghegan
Songs written by Per Gessle